The Righteous Branch of the Church of Jesus Christ of Latter-day Saints, also known as The Righteous Branch, The Branch Church, The Peterson Group and Christ's Church, is a fundamentalist Mormon sect of the Latter Day Saint movement. It is based in Iron County, Utah.

The church's property was originally part of its founder's property outside of Cedar City, and is not part of the incorporated city. Some sect members live near Tonopah in Nye County, Nevada.

History
The Righteous Branch was organized on April 6, 1978, by Gerald Wilbur Peterson Sr. (born October 8, 1917 in Lusk, Wyoming, died January 1981). Peterson claimed that after Rulon C. Allred, the President of the Priesthood of the Apostolic United Brethren, was murdered in May 1977 by followers of Ervil LeBaron, Allred appeared to him and instructed him to preside over the keys of the priesthood.

Peterson organized a new church body with a new Mormon temple on April 6, 1978, two months before the LDS Church's 1978 revelation, which allowed priesthood ordination to black people. Peterson claimed he foresaw this "apostasy" through revelation. The Righteous Branch is organized similarly to the LDS Church with a First Presidency, Quorum of Twelve Apostles, Presiding Bishopric and other priesthood and auxiliary organizations. The Righteous Branch also actively proselytizes and performs proxy baptism for the dead.

As with other Mormon fundamentalist groups, the Righteous Branch believed a priesthood organization and council existed outside of the Church of Jesus Christ of Latter-day Saints (LDS Church), which passed from John Woolley to Joseph Musser, then Rulon Allred, next to Gerald Peterson Sr., next to his son, Gerald W. Peterson Jr., who moved their headquarters to St. George, Utah, and finally to his son Michael Peterson.

Doctrines and practices
In addition to standard Mormon doctrines, ordinances, and practices, the Righteous Branch also practices plural marriage, teaches the Adam–God doctrine, the Curse of Cain doctrine, and lives the United Order. Adherents wear modern dress and do not allow women under 18 to be sealed into plural marriages.

The sect uses a pyramid-shaped temple near Modena in Iron County, thus one of seven Latter Day Saint denominations to have built a temple. They also have a temple in the area (they call it "Lower Smokey") they have settled outside of Tonopah, Nye County, Nevada, they call it "the Building" or "the Blue Building." It is a series of mobile homes that have been converted into a large structure that contains a chapel or meeting hall, a relief society room, a cultural hall, a baptistry and other temple rooms similar to the LDS Church. The Building also contains a commercial kitchen where the sisters get together 

The Righteous Branch, in addition to plural marriage practices Placement marriage, similar to the FLDS. The women, as young as 18, "put their name in" to the prophet (Michael Peterson) who then decides to whom the sister will be married. In the event that a sister is unhappy in her marriage, she can petition to be reassigned, however her new spouse must hold a higher priesthood authority than that of her current spouse. There is a large focus on the "will of God" in all things that they do, if it is not the "will of God" according to Michael Peterson and you choose to do it anyway or choose not to do something that is the "will of God" you face consequences that are eternal in nature.

Prominent members
Sect founder Gerald Peterson Sr. practiced homeopathic medicine. His son Gerald Peterson Jr., who led the group after his father, was also a doctor of osteopathic medicine, practicing homeopathy in Tonopah, Nye County, Nevada. Peterson first studied and served as a medical officer in the United States Army. He died on May 25, 2018.

Mormon fundamentalist and polygamist Tom Green was a member for a short time.

Benjamin Shaffer, who has a strong public presence on the internet, is also a member of the group. He joined from mainstream LDS Church.

See also
 List of Mormon fundamentalist sects
 List of Mormon fundamentalist leaders
 List of denominations in the Latter Day Saint movement

References

Notes

External links 
https://www.christschurchthebranch.org/ (Official Website)

Mormon fundamentalist denominations
Iron County, Utah
Latter Day Saint movement in Utah
Latter Day Saint movement in Nevada
Nye County, Nevada
Organizations based in Utah
Christian organizations established in 1978
Apostolic United Brethren
1978 establishments in Utah